Urs Flühmann (born 1962) is a Swiss orienteering competitor. He is two times Relay World Champion, as a member of the Swiss winning teams in 1991 and 1993, as well as having a silver medal from 1987 and a bronze medal from 1985.  He also obtained bronze in the Individual World Championship in 1987.

References

1962 births
Living people
Swiss orienteers
Male orienteers
Foot orienteers
World Orienteering Championships medalists